Caulerpa lentillifera is a species of ulvophyte green algae from coastal regions in the Asia-Pacific. This seaweed is one of the favored species of edible Caulerpa due to its soft and succulent texture. It is traditionally eaten in the cuisines of Southeast Asia, Oceania, and East Asia. It was first commercially cultivated in the Philippines in the 1950s, followed by Japan in 1968. Both countries remain the top consumers of C. lentillifera. Its cultivation has since spread to other countries, including Vietnam, Taiwan, and China. C. lentillifera, along with C. racemosa, are also known as sea grapes or green caviar in English.

It is a siphonous macroalgae, meaning it is a giant single cell with multiple nuclei, and can grow to 30 cm in length. Instead of leaves, the algae has bubbles that burst in the mouth, releasing an umami taste.

Commercial cultivation
Traditionally, C. lentillifera were harvested directly from the wild. The first commercial cultivation of C. lentillifera was in the 1950s in Cebu, Philippines, after accidental introduction of C. lentillifera to fish ponds. Currently, there are around 400 hectares of ponds in the Cebu, producing around 12 to 15 tons of fresh C. lentillifera per year. They are usually harvested after two months from first planting, and every two weeks afterwards depending on growth rates.

Commercial cultivation was followed by Japan in 1968, where it was cultivated in tanks in the warmer waters of Okinawa. Commercial cultivation has since spread to other countries, including Vietnam, Taiwan, and China (in Fujian and Hainan). Most are for domestic consumption, but they are also exported to Japan.

Culinary uses
Caulerpa lentillifera, along with C. racemosa, have been traditionally eaten in the cuisines of Southeast Asia, Oceania, and East Asia. They are almost always eaten raw on their own or in salads. They have been described as tasting "like the ocean." It is known to be rich in iodine.

In the Philippines, C. lentillifera is usually known as latô or arosep. After being washed in clean water, it is usually eaten raw as a salad (ensaladang lato), mixed with chopped raw shallots and fresh tomatoes, and dressed with a blend of fish sauce or bagoong (fish paste) and vinegar. Its popularity has also spread to the Malaysian state of Sabah (where it is spelled latok) due to the migrations of the Bajau peoples. They are also coveted by coastal Malay communities (as latoh) in the Riau Archipelago and Singapore, the latter until they were displaced inland late 20th century.

It is served dipped in ponzu, made into sushi, added into salads, or eaten as is.

C. lentillifera is also eaten in Vietnam, where it is known as rong nho or rong nho biển, meaning "grape algae"; in Korea, where it is known as bada podo (바다포도), also meaning "sea grapes"; and in Indonesia (particularly Bali), where it is known as bulung.

Health benefits
Several health benefits have been reported for Caulerpa lentillifera including diabetes and lipid lowering properties.

Gallery

See also
 Eucheuma (Gusô)
Gamet
Nori
Sea lettuce
Nama (in Fiji)

References

External links

 Lato, the strange sea salad The trade of the Caulerpa lentillifera in Coron, Philippines
 Guiry, M.D. & Guiry, G.M. 2013. Caulerpa lentillifera J.Agardh, AlgaeBase.  National University of Ireland, Galway., accessed 19 February 2013.
 Caulerpa lentillifera, Seaweed Industry Association

Edible seaweeds
lentillifera
Japanese cuisine
Okinawan cuisine
Philippine cuisine
Raw foods